St Mary's in the Wood Church is a redundant and former United Reform Church place of worship in Morley,  West Yorkshire, England. It was built in 1876-78 on the site of a medieval church. The former church is situated on Troy Road and Commercial Street north of the town. 

The church became redundant in the late 20th century and sat derelict until 2010, when a fire destroyed large parts of the church, leaving only the spire and burnt out parts of the former building remaining. The church congregation is still active although meeting at a new place of worship on Commercial Street further south of the old church in a chapel.

Gallery

See also
 Listed buildings in Morley, West Yorkshire

References

External links
 
 

Churches completed in 1878
Morley
Morley, West Yorkshire